Belousov (or Beloussov), feminine: Belousova is a Russian-Polish patronymic surname formed from the nickname Belous (which also became a surname) derived from Belye Usy, "White Moustache".

Notable people with this surname include:
Alexandr Belousov (born 1998), Moldovan footballer
Andrey Belousov (born 1959), Russian politician and economist
Anna Belousova (born 1996), female Russian swimmer
 Boris Belousov (born 1934, Soviet politician
Boris Belousov (cosmonaut) (1930–1998), Soviet cosmonaut
Boris Pavlovich Belousov (1893–1970), Soviet chemist
Denys Byelousov (born 1996), Ukrainian footballer
Dmitri Belousov (born 1980), Russian footballer
Georgi Belousov (born 1990), Russian ice hockey player
Igor Belousov (1928–2005), Soviet politician
Ilya Belousov (born 1978), Russian football midfielder
Irina Belousova (born 1954), Ukrainian politician
Ludmila Belousova (1935–2017), Russian figure skater
Piotr Belousov (1912–1989), Soviet, Russian painter, graphic artist, and art teacher
Sergey Belousov (born 1990), Russian association footballer
Sonya Belousova (born 1990), Russian-born composer, pianist and recording artist
Vadim Belousov (born 1960), Russian politician
Valentin Danilovich Belousov (1925–1988), Moldavian Soviet mathematician
Valeriy Belousov (born 1970), decathlete from Russia
Valery Belousov (1948–2015), Russian professional ice hockey coach and player
Vladimir Belousov (1907–1990), Soviet geologist
Vladimir Belousov (ski jumper) (born 1946), Soviet ski jumper
Yaroslav Belousov (born 1991), Russian political prisoner
Yevgeny Vladimirovich Belousov (born 1962), Soviet luger
Yuri Leonidovich Belousov (1945–2000), Soviet and Russian researcher and engineer
Zhenya Belousov (1964–1997), Soviet and Russian pop singer

See also
 
 
 Belousov Point

Russian-language surnames
Patronymic surnames